Matthew Stewart "Matt" Yates (born 4 February 1969 in Rochford, Essex) is a retired English athlete who specialised in the middle-distance events.

Athletics career
Yates won the gold medal in the 1500 metres at the 1992 European Indoor Championships. He represented England and won a bronze medal in the 800 metres event, at the 1990 Commonwealth Games in Auckland, New Zealand.

Competition record

Personal bests
Outdoor
800 metres – 1:45.05 (Koblenz 1992)
1000 metres – 2:16.34 (Edinburgh 1990)
1500 metres – 3:35.04 (London 1995)
One mile – 3:52.75 (Oslo 1993)

Indoor
800 metres – 1:50.19 (Birmingham 1997)
1000 metres – 2:17.86 (Birmingham 1992)
1500 metres – 3:44.01 (Ghent 1996)
One mile – 3:54.78 (Birmingham 1992)
3000 metres – 7:50.82 (Seville 1993)

References

All-Athletics profile

1969 births
Living people
English male middle-distance runners
Athletes (track and field) at the 1992 Summer Olympics
Athletes (track and field) at the 1990 Commonwealth Games
Olympic athletes of Great Britain
People from Rochford
Commonwealth Games medallists in athletics
Commonwealth Games bronze medallists for England
Medallists at the 1990 Commonwealth Games